The University of Kentucky (UK) in Lexington, Kentucky is home to many notable structures, including one high-rise.

By floor count and height above ground level, the tallest building is the 18-floor Patterson Office Tower, consisting mostly of faculty and administrative offices. Demolition of the previous tallest buildings, the 23-story Kirwan Tower and Blanding Tower, parts of the former Kirwan-Blanding Residence Hall complex, began in May 2020. Even before the demolition of Blanding and Kirwan Towers, the Patterson Office Tower reached the highest altitude of any campus building because it sits on one of the highest points of the university. All three high-rises were built in the mid-1960s.

Recent developments
Recently constructed is a new parking structure for the Albert B. Chandler Hospital at South Limestone between Conn Terrace Transcript Avenue. The 1,600 space garage will be connected to the lobby of the new patient care facility via a skyway.

In the summer of 2010, Keeneland Hall, the first co-ed dormitory in the state, was named a state historic site by the Kentucky State Historical Society. This designation did not prevent it from being torn down in 2014 to make way for the new Limestone Park dormitory development.

In 2014, plans to replace most of the older north campus residence halls—specifically Boyd, Holmes, Keeneland, and Jewell Halls—with a new residential complex were approved. New residence halls have also been planned for the College of Agriculture campus along University Drive and Nicholasville Road between Cooper Drive and Alumni Drive, the Medical Center campus along Transcript Avenue, near the Johnson Student Recreation Center at Cooper Drive, at Stoll Field next to the current Student Center, within the College Town district north of Euclid Avenue, along Washington Avenue (to be converted into a pedestrian-only facility) and along Scott Street.

Through the first part of the 21st century, substantial housing was needed due to increased freshman enrollment and the deteriorated conditions of surrounding neighborhoods. By 2010, the university planned to achieve 33% undergraduate housing, requiring the construction of an additional 2,500 units. By 2020, due to fast undergraduate growth, the university wanted to raise the undergraduate housing percentage to at least 40%, requiring the construction of at least 2,800 additional units. The ratio of graduate students to graduate units in Cooperstown and Greg Page Apartments would also need to be increased from 11% to 15%. The existing facilities would also need to be replaced. By 2010, 350 new units would need to be constructed, followed by an additional 250 units by 2020.

These projections proved inaccurate—even though the 2013–2019 period saw the completion of over 6,800 residence hall beds (including replacements for demolished and decommissioned halls), the 2019–20 school year saw more than 90% of a school-record freshman class of more than 5,300, plus more than 2,000 upperclassmen, live on campus.

Future
One of the more recent developments on campus is the long-delayed demolition of the Kirwan–Blanding residence hall complex. While approved in 2017, demolition was delayed due to a lack of funding for work required before demolition could start, mainly asbestos removal and the rerouting of utilities located under the complex that served much of the southern half of campus. With funding found for the rerouting, that project began in summer 2019, and demolition began on the complex in May 2020 after rerouting was completed. When UK announced final demolition plans in December 2019, it indicated that most of the  site would be converted to green space, with a new 500-bed residence hall built on part of the property. Longer-term plans also allow for potential construction of two more residence halls on the site. Plans to build the new residence hall were placed on hold due to uncertainties brought on by the COVID-19 pandemic.

Timeline
The "Campus" listings refer to those used by the university on its current campus maps (as of 2018–19). These designations have changed over time. Several of the current area designations, including the "Academic Core", were not historically used. Additionally, some buildings have had their area designations changed, such as the now-demolished Kirwan–Blanding residence complex, historically considered part of the south campus but now considered part of the central campus.

See also
 Cityscape of Lexington, Kentucky

References

External links
University of Kentucky Virtual Campus Tour
UK Campus Housing Master Plan

 
Kentucky, University of
University of Kentucky